Johnny Boykins Rutledge, III (born January 4, 1977) is an American former college and professional football player who was a linebacker in the National Football League (NFL) for five seasons during the 1990s and 2000s.  Rutledge played college football for the University of Florida, and was a member of a national championship team.  A second round pick in the 1999 NFL Draft, he played professionally for the Arizona Cardinals and the Denver Broncos of the NFL.

Early years 

Rutledge was born in Belle Glade, Florida in 1977.  He attended Glades Central High School in Belle Glade, where he played high school football for the Glades Central Raiders.

College career 

Rutledge accepted an athletic scholarship to attend the University of Florida in Gainesville, Florida, where he played for coach Steve Spurrier's Florida Gators football team from 1995 to 1998.  He was a member of the 1996 Gators' team that defeated the Florida State Seminoles 52–20 in the Sugar Bowl for the Bowl Alliance national championship.  He was a second-team All-Southeastern Conference (SEC) selection as a junior in 1997, and a first-team selection as a senior in 1998.

Rutledge later returned to Gainesville after his NFL career was over, and graduated from the University of Florida with a bachelor's degree in health and human performance in 2007.

Professional career 

In his five-season NFL career, Rutledge appeared in forty-six regular season games.

See also 

 Florida Gators football, 1990–99
 History of the Denver Broncos
 List of Florida Gators in the NFL Draft
 List of University of Florida alumni

References

Bibliography 

 Carlson, Norm, University of Florida Football Vault: The History of the Florida Gators, Whitman Publishing, LLC, Atlanta, Georgia (2007).  .
 Golenbock, Peter, Go Gators!  An Oral History of Florida's Pursuit of Gridiron Glory, Legends Publishing, LLC, St. Petersburg, Florida (2002).  .
 Hairston, Jack, Tales from the Gator Swamp: A Collection of the Greatest Gator Stories Ever Told, Sports Publishing, LLC, Champaign, Illinois (2002).  .
 McCarthy, Kevin M.,  Fightin' Gators: A History of University of Florida Football, Arcadia Publishing, Mount Pleasant, South Carolina (2000).  .
 Nash, Noel, ed., The Gainesville Sun Presents The Greatest Moments in Florida Gators Football, Sports Publishing, Inc., Champaign, Illinois (1998).  .

1977 births
Living people
People from Belle Glade, Florida
Sportspeople from the Miami metropolitan area
Players of American football from Florida
African-American players of American football
American football linebackers
Florida Gators football players
Arizona Cardinals players
Denver Broncos players
21st-century African-American sportspeople
20th-century African-American sportspeople